Souk Es Sekajine or Souk Es Sarragine is one of the souks of the medina of Tunis. specializing in leather goods, saddles, and horse harnesses.

Name 
The term Es Sekajine is a mutation of ach-chakkazine, referring to traditional craftsmen who made achkouz, saddles of high-quality leather.

In some European books, it is instead called Souk des Selliers, meaning "souk of s".

Location 

The souk is situated west of Al-Zaytuna Mosque and east of Bab Menara gate.

History 

The souk has existed since the 15th century CE. It was revived in the 18th century by Al-Husayn I ibn Ali of the Husainid Dynasty.

In modern times, the souk has a variety of merchants and there are only two saddlemakers remaining there.

Monuments 
The souk has two monuments: a Tomb of the Unknown Soldier and the tomb of the Majorcan writer Anselm Turmeda.

References

External links 

 

Sekajine